Planaltina may refer to:

Geography 
 Planaltina, Federal District, an administrative region in the Federal District, Brazil
 Planaltina, Goiás, a municipality in the state of Goiás (in the metropolitan region of Brasilia), Brazil
 Planaltina do Paraná, a municipality in the state of Paraná, Brazil

Sport 
 Planaltina Esporte Clube, a football club of the Federal District, Brazil

Biology 
 Planaltina (fish), a genus of characins endemic to Brazil
 Planaltina (plant), a genus of Rubiaceae endemic to Brazil

Genus disambiguation pages